Arthur Brand is most famously known as a Dutch art crime investigator who has recovered over 200 works of art. His vocation is being an art historian and art consultant. It is for the love of art that he takes on lost art recovery as a personal interest.

Brand's interest in stolen art recovery began when he was an exchange student in southern Spain. He met some gypsies with whom he went on a treasure hunt that resulted in the discovery of three silver Roman coins. He was inspired by that journey to begin conducting detective work on his own. He conducted research through newspapers to learn about stolen works of art.

Amongst other works, he tracked down a 1600-year-old missing mosaic, and a Byzantine-era depiction of St. Mark that was stolen four decades previously. He also helped recover Salvador Dalí’s "Adolescence", during which CBS quoted that "He's described as the Indiana Jones of the art world". Other recovered works include Tamara de Lempicka's "La Musicienne." Brand was involved in the pursuit of several paintings that were stolen from the Dutch city of Hoorn. He retrieved Oscar Wilde's ring, returned to Oxford University's Magdalen College and Picasso's Buste de Femme. He has written 2 books about his recoveries (Hitler's Horses and Het verboden Judas-evangelie en de schat van Carchemish) and there is a Dutch documentary series about his recoveries: De Kunstdetective.

Publications 
Brand, Arthur, and Hedley-Prole. Hitler’s Horses. Zaltbommel-Netherlands, Netherlands, Van Haren Publishing, 2021.

Brand, Anton. Het Verboden Judas Evangelie En de Schat van Carchemish / Druk 1. Aspekt, 2006.

References 

Living people
Year of birth missing (living people)